Molineria is a genus of flowering plants.  In the APG III classification system, it is placed in the family Hypoxidaceae. It is native to Southeast Asia, China, the Indian Subcontinent, Papuasia, and Queensland.

Species
 Molineria capitulata (Lour.) Herb. - China, Indian Subcontinent, Southeast Asia, Papuasia, Queensland; naturalized in Mexico, Central America, West Indies, Argentina, Mauritius, Réunion
 Molineria crassifolia Baker - Nepal, Assam, Bhutan, Sikkim, Yunnan, Arunachal Pradesh
 Molineria gracilis Kurz - southern China, Assam, Bhutan, Nepal, Cambodia, Thailand, Vietnam
 Molineria latifolia (Dryand. ex W.T.Aiton) Herb. ex Kurz - China, Bangladesh, Indochina, Philippines, western Indonesia, Borneo
 Molineria oligantha C.E.C.Fisch. - Assam
 Molineria prainiana Deb - Assam, Bhutan
 Molineria trichocarpa (Wight) N.P.Balakr. - southern India, Sri Lanka

References

Hypoxidaceae